Sergey Zaikov (Russian:Сергей Зайков, born 23 September 1987 in Pavlodar) is a Kazakhstani runner. He competed at the 2012 Summer Olympics in the 400 m event, in which he was defeated after the first round.

Competition record

References

External links

Living people
1987 births
People from Pavlodar
Kazakhstani male sprinters
Olympic athletes of Kazakhstan
Athletes (track and field) at the 2012 Summer Olympics
Athletes (track and field) at the 2014 Asian Games
Asian Games competitors for Kazakhstan